Empire Party may refer to:

British Empire Party, a defunct political party in the United Kingdom
Deutsche Reichspartei, a defunct political party in Germany
Teikokutō, a defunct political party in Japan